Old Bill and Son is a 1941 British black-and-white comedy war film directed by Ian Dalrymple. Centred on the First World War cartoon figure Old Bill and his escapades in the early Phoney War of World War II and with that character's creator Bruce Bairnsfather as one of its screenwriters, it stars Morland Graham, John Mills, Mary Clare and Ronald Shiner as Herbert 'Bert' Smith. It is executive produced by Alexander Korda for Legeran Films.

Plot
Old Bill, an old First World War soldier, argues with his son Young Bill about the latter not holding down a job. Soon afterwards the Second World War breaks out and Young Bill and the family lodger Sally both join up. Envious of them and despite his wife Maggie's entreaties not to, Old Bill attempts to join up but is turned down at the recruiting office and by his old commanding officer, who Old Bill had hoped would pull strings for him. He is finally successful, joining the Royal Pioneer Corps, and both he and his son are sent to France. There Old Bill helps his son dig a Universal Carrier out of the mud and meets his long-lost friend Canuck, a poilu in the previous war and now a hotelier, and his daughter Françoise.

Young Bill attempts to woo Françoise against competition from another soldier who - unlike him - can speak French. He also tricks his father into sleeping in a bed at Canuck's hotel which has actually been reserved by the colonel of Young Bill's regiment, but takes the blame when the colonel discovers the ruse. The colonel turns out to have a lieutenant in Old Bill's First World War regiment and so gets him attached to Young Bill's regiment. Soon afterwards a letter arrives from Maggie stating that she too has joined up.

Sally arrives at the Bills' base again as driver to the singer Stella Malloy, who has been sent to the wrong unit for a concert party, so the colonel has Old Bill organise one for his regiment instead. Young Bill bids farewell to his father, stating that his affections have returned from Françoise to Sally, just before joining a squad from the regiment on a raid to capture a German prisoner. He does not return from the raid and Old Bill and Canuck go to find him, only to find him and a friend guarding a large group of German prisoners. They march the prisoners back to base together as Canuck and the two Bills discuss the differences between German soldiers and those of free nations such as Britain and France.

Cast
 Morland Graham as Old Bill
 John Mills as Young Bill Busby
 Mary Clare as Maggie
 Renee Houston as Stella Malloy
 Rene Ray as Sally
 Gus McNaughton as Alf
 Ronald Shiner as Herbert 'Bert' Smith
 Manning Whiley as Chimp
 Janine Darcey as Françoise
 Roland Culver as Colonel
 Donald Stuart as Canuck
 Nicholas Phipps as BBC Reporter
 Allan Jeayes as Willoughby

Critical reception
In contemporary reviews, The Manchester Guardian wrote, "The plot is a disconnected business, a series of episodes of the sort we usually call picaresque when we really mean stragglesome. It is, in fact, as glaringly unkempt and untidy as Old Bill's famous moustache which that delightful actor Morland Graham wears with conviction and distinction," and The Sunday Express wrote, "chalk up a hit for Morland Graham on this picture as Old Bill...it's an amusing highly sentimental affair written in the authentic language of the Front with no attempt to be subtle...a pity to see so fine an actor as John Mills in so empty a part."

References

External links
 
 
 

1941 films
1940s war comedy films
British black-and-white films
Films directed by Ian Dalrymple
British World War II propaganda films
British war comedy films
Films produced by Alexander Korda
Films with screenplays by Ian Dalrymple
Films scored by Richard Addinsell
Films set in London
1941 comedy films
1940s English-language films